Succisella is a genus of flowering plants in the family Caprifoliaceae. There are four or five species in the genus. They are all native to Europe; three are endemic to the Iberian Peninsula.

Species include:
 Succisella andreae-molinae (not accepted by some sources)
 Succisella carvalhoana 
 Succisella inflexa – southern succisella
 Succisella microcephala
Succisella petteri

Etymology
Succisella ostensibly means ‘cut off from below’ or ‘abruptly ending’.

References

Caprifoliaceae
Caprifoliaceae genera